LG MG320  or KG320 (for Europe) is a GSM Tri-Band mobile phone manufactured and sold by LG Electronics.  The LG Aegis is a 'candy-bar' style phone and is part of the 2007  line up of the LG Malo. The phone has received some criticism for its lack of external memory support.

Features 
 Talk time: up to 3 hours
 Standby time: up to 8 days
 Dimensions: 96 mmx46 mmx99 mm.
 Bands: GSM 900/1800/1900 or GSM 850/1800/1900 MHz 
 GPRS : Class 10 (2U/4D)
 Display: TFT, 262K colours, 176 x 220 resolution
 Memory: 128 MB internal
 Camera: 1.3-megapixel.
 Multimedia playback: MP3, AMR, MID, MIDI, WMA, AAC, 3GP
 Digital Right Management
 Java support: MIDP 2.0, CLDC 1.1 
 Local connectivity: Bluetooth v2.0 + EDR (supports A2DP), USB v2.0

LG mobile line up 
The Aegis (MG320) is part of the line up of LG Electronics, this line up also include the LG Shine, LG Prada (KE850), LG Dimple, LG DarkHorse

Specifications

See also 
 LG Electronics
 LG Cyon

KG320